Below are a list of songs by singer-songwriter Drake Bell.

List

References

Bell, Drake